Sir Arthur Gregory George Marshall, OBE, (4 December 1903 – 16 March 2007) was a British aviation pioneer and businessman, who served as the chairman of Marshall Aerospace between 1942 and 1989.

Early life and education 

Arthur Marshall was born in Cambridge, England and was educated at The Perse School in Cambridge and at Tonbridge School in Kent, completing his education at Jesus College, Cambridge, where he earned a first-class degree in engineering.

He learned to fly in 1928, and shortly thereafter created an airstrip near his family's Cambridge home, which by 1929 had turned into a full-fledged airfield. Six years later, Marshall and his father, David, bought the land where the present Cambridge Airport now stands and started Marshall Aerospace.

During World War II, Marshall's played a key role in training over 20,000 pilots and flying instructors.

Under Sir Arthur's guidance, the firm became the UK's largest aircraft repairer, fixing or converting 5,000 planes during the war. Over the years, such major airplane manufacturers as De Havilland, Bristol, Vickers and English Electric have entrusted Marshall's with the servicing of their aircraft.

Marshall's company built under subcontract the famous droop nose for Concorde.

Sport 

In addition to his interest in aeronautics, Marshall also became a gifted sportsman early in his life and tried out for a place on the British team at the 1924 Olympics in Paris, a team which was depicted in the 1981 Oscar-winning film Chariots of Fire. He helped to stage the "Chariots of Fire" charity run through Cambridge for a trophy named in his honour.

Honours 

Marshall was appointed an OBE in 1948, and was knighted in 1974. In 1931, he married Rosemary Dimsdale. The couple had three children, including Michael Marshall, who took over the running of the company upon Sir Arthur's retirement. Lady Marshall died on 24 June 1988.

On the death of James Stillman Rockefeller in August 2004 he became the oldest living Olympic athlete.

Death 

He died in the early hours of 16 March 2007 at his home near Linton in Cambridgeshire, aged 103.
 
To commemorate Sir Arthur's lifelong interest in aviation, the Marshall family donated a trophy to the Air Training Corps to be presented to "The Most Improved Squadron in the ATC over a Protracted Period of Time".

References

External links
Article from Marshall Web Site on Sir Arthur's 100th Birthday Celebration
Article from Air-Scene UK
Obituary, The Guardian, 26 March 2007
The Papers of Sir Arthur Marshall held at Churchill Archives Centre

1903 births
2007 deaths
English aerospace engineers
English centenarians
Men centenarians
Alumni of Jesus College, Cambridge
Knights Bachelor
Officers of the Order of the British Empire
People educated at The Perse School
People educated at Tonbridge School
People from Cambridge
People from Linton, Cambridgeshire
20th-century English businesspeople